Seetha is a 1970 Kannada-language romantic drama film directed actor Vadiraj and produced by actress Harini. The film starred Gangadhar, Kalpana and Srinath.

The film's soundtrack and score by Vijaya Bhaskar was widely acclaimed.

Cast 
 Gangadhar as Ramanath
 Kalpana as Seetha
 Srinath
 Ramesh
 K. S. Ashwath
 Srilalitha
 Seetharam
 Indrani

Soundtrack 
The music was composed by Vijaya Bhaskar with lyrics by R. N. Jayagopal. All the songs composed for the film were received extremely well and considered as evergreen songs.

References

External links 
 

1970 films
1970s Kannada-language films
Indian romantic drama films
Indian black-and-white films
Films scored by Vijaya Bhaskar
1970 romantic drama films